Patrick Hatlestad (born September 5, 1943) is an American politician in the state of North Dakota. He is a member of the North Dakota House of Representatives, representing the 1st district. A Republican, he was first elected in 2007. An alumnus of University of North Dakota and Western Washington University, he is a retired teacher and former President of the Tri-County Economic Development Board, and Williston Chamber of Commerce.

References

1943 births
Living people
North Dakota Republicans
University of North Dakota alumni
Western Washington University alumni
People from Grand Forks County, North Dakota
21st-century American politicians